Pillalamarri may refer to one of the following pages:

 Pillalamarri, an 800-year-old banyan tree located in Mahabubnagar, Telangana, India. 
 Erakeswara Temple, Pillalamarri, a 13th century Siva temple in Pillalamarri village of Suryapet district of Telangana, India.
 Nameswara Temple, Pillalamarri, a 13th century Siva temple in Pillalamarri village of Suryapet district of Telangana, India.